Riverview High School, or simply known as RHS, is a public high school in Riverview, New Brunswick, Canada. It is part of the province's Anglophone East School District, offering education to students from grade nine to twelve. It is the only high school in Riverview, and one of four Anglophone high schools in Greater Moncton.

History
The school was founded in September 1978 starting with two Grade 10 classes. Prior to that date Grades 10 through 12 from the then community of Riverview Heights attended Moncton High School. From its beginnings until 1978, the high school was located at 45 Devere Road, now the site of Riverview Middle School.

In 1978 a new facility was opened on an 18-hectare site about two kilometres west of the old school (which became Riverview Middle School). The new school also has a swimming pool, a feature the old school did not possess. In 2006 the auditorium began to operate independently for community use and plays host to many different shows each year, including a Stereos/The Midway State concert in November 2009. The most recent play was a take on Disney's Broadway classics, put on by students at the school.(2018) with the upcoming play being rendition of the Sound of Music. (2019)

The building
The school has a theatre (The Riverview Arts Centre), a gymnasium, music rooms, a cafeteria, a library, a swimming pool, a courtyard, two art rooms, three computer labs, a woodshop, automotive lab, a culinary tech room/kitchen, and three science labs.

School culture

The school has its own song. The school's colours are red and white; the mascot is a lion.

Notable alumni

Michael de Adder: Class of 1985. Canadian editorial cartoonist and caricaturist working at The Washington Post.
Travis Jayner: Class of 2000. A member of the United States short track speed skating team and winner of a bronze medal in the 5000m relay in the 2010 Winter Olympics in Vancouver, British Columbia, Canada.
Michael LeBlanc: Class of 2005. Represented Canada in the 60m at the 2012 IAAF World Indoor Championships in Istanbul, Turkey.

See also
List of schools in New Brunswick

References

External links
 Riverview High School
 Anglophone East School District

Educational institutions established in 1962
High schools in New Brunswick
Schools in Albert County, New Brunswick
Riverview, New Brunswick
Buildings and structures in Albert County, New Brunswick